Mylothris smithii is a butterfly in the family Pieridae. It is found on Madagascar. The habitat consists of forests.

References

Seitz, A. Die Gross-Schmetterlinge der Erde 13: Die Afrikanischen Tagfalter. Plate XIII 13

Butterflies described in 1879
Pierini
Endemic fauna of Madagascar
Butterflies of Africa
Taxa named by Paul Mabille